The New Testament Virtual Manuscript Room (NT.VMR) is a virtual manuscript reading room, where all New Testament manuscripts are available online.

It is aproject of the Institute for New Testament Textual Research in Münster / Westphalia.  Information is offered for manuscripts of the New Testament and is linked to the digitized pictures and transcriptions. This intergenerational project is to make all of the more than 5,800 Greek manuscripts of the New Testament digitally visible for research.

VMR 
In the Virtual Manuscript Room manuscripts can be selected and displayed. In order to meet different scientific purposes, there are three different viewer modes to choose from. The main mode is the reading mode, which allows page-scrolling of a manuscript, while at the same time picture and transcript are displayed.

The provision of digital copies is done by its holding institutions (or by organisations that produce digital photos of manuscripts – like e.g. CSNTM). In this case, either newly built digital copies or scans of black-and-white microfilms from the 1960s to 1980s (from the archives of the INTF) can be chosen.

Handschriftenliste 
Kurt Aland's official "Kurzgefaßte Liste" of Greek manuscripts of the New Testament (2nd edition 1994) is available online. This covers the most well-known New Testament manuscripts and has the following data on each one:
 The century of creation
 Content
 Format
 Owner of the manuscript

Video 
 Information about how to usw the NT.VMR

External links 
 New Testament Virtual Manuscript Room (NT.VMR)
 Institute for New Testament Textual Research (INTF)

Biblical manuscripts
New Testament theology